For 1982 in television, see:

1982 in Albanian television
1982 in American television
1982 in Australian television
1982 in Austrian television
1982 in Belgian television
1982 in Brazilian television
1982 in British television
1982 in Canadian television
1982 in Croatian television
1982 in Czech television
1982 in Danish television
1982 in Dutch television
1982 in Estonian television
1982 in French television
1982 in German television
1982 in Irish television
1982 in Israeli television
1982 in Italian television
1982 in Japanese television
1982 in New Zealand television
1982 in Norwegian television
1982 in Portuguese television
1982 in Philippine television
1982 in Scottish television
1982 in Singapore television
1982 in South African television
1982 in Swedish television
1982 in Thai television